Ben Broussard is the first studio album by the American rock artist Ben Broussard.

"Hold on to Me" and "Again" were featured in 2005 episodes of A&E's series Dog The Bounty Hunter.

His songs "105" and "Hold on to Me" were featured in episodes of South of Nowhere, a TV series on Noggin's teen block "The N." "Deep", another of his songs, was used in a commercial advertising the show.

Track listing
I Hate Goodbyes
Take It All Back
Again
105
Three
I Know It Will
Hold On To Me
Deep
Decision
Children
Hitting The Ground
The Day

References 

2005 albums